Maria Slavona, born Marie Dorette Caroline Schorer  (14 March 1865, Lübeck - 10 May 1931, Berlin) was a German impressionist painter.

Life 

Her father, was a pharmacist and politician who was known for his campaign to improve the quality of Lübeck's drinking water. Her oldest sister, Cornelia Schorer, became one of the first female doctors in Germany. At the age of seventeen, after some informal lessons in painting and drawing, she went to Berlin to study at a private art school before moving on to the teaching institute at the Museum of Decorative Arts, which she attended until 1886. The following year, she began studies at the Verein der Berliner Künstlerinnen, an art school for women, where they were allowed to study anatomy and draw from live models. The official Prussian Academy of Art was still a male-only institution at that time.

In 1888, she moved to Munich, taking private lessons from the portrait painter Alois Erdtelt, then attending the  Women's Academy, where her most influential teacher was Ludwig von Herterich, who introduced her to impressionism. Later, on a holiday back home, she met some Scandinavian artists and travelled to Paris with them but, except for the Louvre, was rather disappointed.

First successes
One of her companions on the trip was the Danish painter Vilhelm Petersen and, as they became closer friends, they both decided to take assumed names for their artworks. He chose Willy Gretor and she became Maria Slavona. They also had an illegitimate daughter who later became an actress under the name , after the man her mother married in 1900, the Swiss art dealer Otto Ackermann (1871-1963). Slavona's first exhibit came in 1893 at the Salon de Champ-de-Mars of the Société Nationale des Beaux-Arts, ironically under the male pseudonym "Carl-Maria Plavona". In 1901, she joined the Berlin Secession, returned to Lübeck in 1906 and came back to Berlin in 1909. 

Near the end of the 1920s, her health began to deteriorate and, having failed to find a cure with traditional medicine, turned to anthroposophy and naturopathy. Her health never improved, however, and her last years were spent painting flowers and landscapes in the vicinity of her home near Münsing.

Her work was forgotten for many years, having been branded as "Entartete Kunst" (Degenerate Art) in 1933. During World War II, many of her paintings were destroyed, either intentionally or as a result of the war. It wasn't until 1981 that a significant retrospective was held by the Bröhan Museum in Berlin.

References

Further reading 
 Margrit Bröhan: Maria Slavona 1865–1931. Eine deutsche Impressionistin. Exhibition Catalog, Sammlung Stiftung Bröhan, Berlin and Lübeck, 1981.
 Wulf Schadendorf: Museum Behnhaus. Das Haus und seine Räume. Malerei, Skulptur, Kunsthandwerk, revised and expanded edition. Museum für Kunst u. Kulturgeschichte d. Hansestadt, Lübeck 1976, pg.114
 Lübeckische Anzeigen; Lübeck, 18 March 1920, Article: Maria Slavona
 Ulrike Wolff-Thomsen: Die Pariser Boheme (1889 - 1895): Ein autobiographischer Bericht der Malerin Rosa Pfäffiger, (section of letters from Pfäffinger to Maria Slavona), Verlag Ludwig, Kiel 2007,

External links 

 ArtNet: More works by Slavona
 Unser Lübeck (8 March 2010) "Maria Slavona: Lübecker Apothekertochter wird eine berühmte Malerin des deutschen Impressionismus", by Christel Busch
 

1865 births
1931 deaths
German women painters
Impressionism
19th-century German painters
20th-century German painters
19th-century German women artists
20th-century German women artists